Juro Kuronen (born February 18, 1982) is a Finnish former professional ice hockey defenceman.

Career
Kuronen began his career with KalPa's junior teams before joining Hermes in Finland's second-tier league Mestis in 2000. After two seasons, he moved to KalPa who were promoted to SM-liiga in 2005. In his one season in SM-liiga, Kuronen played 42 game during the 2005–06 season, scoring four goals and three assists.

He moved back down to Mestis the following year with Jokipojat for two seasons before moving to Sweden's third-tier Hockeyettan with Olofströms IK for one season. He then returned to Finland with brief spells with IPK and KalPa Team in the 2. Divisioona before retiring in 2012.

Kuronen was a member of the gold medal-winning Finland team in the 2000 IIHF World U18 Championships.

Career statistics

References

External links

1982 births
Living people
Finnish ice hockey defencemen
Iisalmen Peli-Karhut players
Jokipojat players
KalPa players
Kokkolan Hermes players
Olofströms IK players
People from Kuopio
Sportspeople from North Savo